Von Tilzer is a surname. Notable people with the surname include:

Albert Von Tilzer (1878–1956), American songwriter, brother of Harry
Harry Von Tilzer (1872–1946), American songwriter